Dragon boat at the 2010 Asian Games was held in Guangzhou, China from November 18 to 20, 2010. All events were held at Zengcheng Dragon Boat Lake.

Schedule

Medalists

Men

Women

Medal table

Participating nations
A total of 407 athletes from 11 nations competed in dragon boat at the 2010 Asian Games:

References
 2010 Asian Games Official Website

 
2010 Asian Games events
2010